Pisac is a city in Peru.

Pisac may also refer to:
 Pisac District, a district in Peru
 Pisach, or Piśac, a type of demons in South and Southeast Asian mythologies

See also
 Pisak, a village in Croatia